Onslow is a surname. Notable people with the surname include:

 Alexander Onslow (1842–1908), third Chief Justice of the Supreme Court of Western Australia
 Arthur Onslow (disambiguation)
 Cranley Onslow (1926–2001), British politician
 Denzil Onslow (disambiguation)
 Edward Onslow (1758–1829), British nobleman, Member of Parliament and fellow of the Royal Society
 George Onslow (disambiguation)
 Guildford Onslow (1814–1882), English politician
 Jack Onslow (1888–1960), American Major League Baseball player, manager, coach and scout 
 Muriel Wheldale Onslow (1880–1932), British biochemist
 Richard Onslow (disambiguation)
 Thomas Onslow (disambiguation)
 William Onslow, 4th Earl of Onslow (1853–1911)
 William Onslow, 6th Earl of Onslow (1913–1971)